Absinthe is the fifth and final studio album by the band Naked City. Unlike the band's other genre-mixing releases, the music on Absinthe is consistently in an ambient and noise style.

The titles of many of its tracks refer to the works of Paul Verlaine, Charles Baudelaire and other figures in the fin de siècle Decadent movement, and to the drink after which the album is named. The album's cover and liner notes feature photographs by the German Surrealist Hans Bellmer.

From the official description on the now defunct Avant website:

"Joey Baron plays bags of dry leaves, fishing reels and buckshot. Bill Frisell solos on a microtonal guitar. Wayne Horvitz samples everything from crickets to Giacinto Scelsi. Fred Frith does what he does best. Zorn doesn't even touch the saxophone."

The final track, "...Rend Fou", is a six-minute recording of Frisell and Frith running their guitar jacks over the inputs of their guitars.

The album was also released as part of Naked City: The Complete Studio Recordings on Tzadik Records.

Reception

The Allmusic review by Caleb Deupree states "Naked City's final album is by far its most puzzling and enigmatic... Nothing in Naked City's previous oeuvre prepares the listener for this collection, a complete reversal from the hardcore and thrash metal, but looking forward to Zorn's interest in minimalist pieces like Redbird and Duras."

Track listing
All compositions by John Zorn

Personnel
John Zorn - vocals, synthesizer, sampler
Bill Frisell - guitar
Fred Frith - bass guitar
Wayne Horvitz - keyboards, synthesizer, sampler
Joey Baron - percussion

Liner Notes
Published by Theatre of Musical Optics, BMI
Produced by John Zorn
Executive Producer: Disk Union
Recorded at Electric Lady, NYC December 1992
Mixed at Platinum Island, NYC January 1993
Engineered by Joe Ferla
Assistant Engineer: Hoover Le
Mastered by Scott Hull
Cover photo: Hans Bellmer "Les Jeux de la Poupée"
Design: Tomoyo T.L. (Karath=Razar)
Photo typesetting: Lisa Wells
Special thanks to: Fujieda Mamoru, Giacinto Scelsi, Mick Harris

References

1993 albums
Naked City (band) albums
Albums produced by John Zorn
Avant Records albums